Daoyod Dara; born February 9, 1954) is a Thai footballer and former Thailand national team player. He has played for national team since 1975-1986.

Dara played for Thailand in qualifying matches for the 1982 FIFA World Cup.

References

1954 births
Living people
Daoyod Dara
Daoyod Dara
Daoyod Dara
Daoyod Dara
Association football forwards
Daoyod Dara
Daoyod Dara
Daoyod Dara
Daoyod Dara
Southeast Asian Games medalists in football
Competitors at the 1977 Southeast Asian Games
Daoyod Dara